The Swedish Sign Language family is a language family of sign languages, including Swedish Sign Language, Portuguese Sign Language, and Finnish Sign Language. 

Swedish SL started about 1800. Wittmann (1991) proposes that it descends from British Sign Language. Regardless, Swedish SL in turn gave rise to Portuguese Sign Language (1823) and Finnish Sign Language (1850s), the latter with local admixture; Finnish and Swedish Sign are mutually unintelligible.  

Ethnologue reports that Danish Sign Language is largely mutually intelligible with Swedish Sign, though Wittmann places DSL in the French Sign Language family. There are no known dialects in the Swedish Sign Language, however, it is partly intelligible with other manual languages such as Danish (DSL), Norwegian (NSL), and Finnish (FSE). 

The Finland-Swedish Sign Language, also known as FinSSL, was created by the deaf community of Swedish backgrounds inhabiting the coastal areas of Finland. It is declared as an independent language given the connection to the Finland-Swedish culture.

References